Phialastrum is a genus of fungi in the family Geastraceae. A monotypic genus, it contains the single species Phialastrum barbatum, described by Sunhede in 1989.

External links
Index Fungorum

Geastraceae
Monotypic Basidiomycota genera